Tower Hill School is a private college preparatory school in Wilmington, Delaware, offering instruction for pre-school through 12th grade.

History
Tower Hill was founded in 1919. The school is situated at the high point of Wilmington's neighborhood, The Highlands, where the dominant landmark is Rockford Tower, erected in 1901 to control the city's water supply. Tower Hill, in London, is the birthplace of William Penn, the founder of Pennsylvania, who landed in Delaware, in 1682.

Recognition
The school is a member of the Delaware Independent School Conference. The school offered 2,000,000 a year of need-based financial aid to 28% of its students for the 2016–2017 school year. The Wall Street Journal ranked Tower Hill 24th in the nation and 1st in Delaware, in percentage of students attending eight top colleges. Tower Hill School is ranked 47th in the nation for best private day schools.

Notable alumni

 Adrienne Arsht, philanthropist and attorney
 Michael N. Castle, Governor of Delaware (1985–1992) and US Congressman (Delaware) (1993–2011)
 Alfred D. Chandler, distinguished and innovative historian, Harvard University
 Chris Coons, US Senator (Delaware)
 Crawford Hallock Greenewalt, Jr., leading archaeologist University of California, Berkeley
Kathryn Day, opera singer
 Harry G. Haskell Jr., US Congressman (Delaware) (1957–1959) and Mayor of Wilmington (1969–1973)
 Deborah Kean, former First Lady of New Jersey (1982–1990)
 Orin Kerr, law professor at UC Berkeley School of Law
 Ellen J. Kullman, former chief executive officer of DuPont and vice chair of the Tower Hill School board of trustees
 Jim Morris (film producer), President of Pixar Animation Studios
 Mehmet Oz, host of The Dr. Oz Show, cardiologist, Republican Party nominee in the 2022 United States Senate election in Pennsylvania
  Virginia A. Seitz, former assistant attorney general and distinguished appellate lawyer
  John A. H. Sweeney, museum curator and author
 Pat Williams, Orlando Magic senior vice president

Controversy 
In 2014, the former President of the school Christopher Wheeler was found guilty and sentenced to 50 years in prison for dealing in child pornography. However, the sentence was overturned in 2016 after the Delaware Supreme Court found that the search warrants used to search his residence and office were unconstitutionally broad. In 2022, the high school admissions director was arrested for allegedly sending and receiving lewd photos of minors since 2019.

References

External links
 

Educational institutions established in 1919
High schools in New Castle County, Delaware
Schools in New Castle County, Delaware
Private elementary schools in Delaware
Private middle schools in Delaware
Private high schools in Delaware
Private K-12 schools in the United States
Preparatory schools in Delaware
1919 establishments in Delaware